The Société de Linguistique de Paris (established 1864) is the editing body of the BSL (Bulletin de la Société de Linguistique) journal. Members of the society have included such well-known French linguists as Bréal, Saussure, Meillet, and Benveniste.

In addition to its monthly meetings, the group holds a one-day conference each January dedicated to a particular topic. In 1997, it organised the Congrès International des Linguistes in Paris.

References

External links
http://www.slp-paris.com/

Linguistic societies
Organizations based in Paris